Mormaer Maol Domhnaich (sometimes anglicized as Maldoven) was the son of Mormaer Ailín II, and ruled Lennox 1217–1250.

Like his predecessor Ailín II, he showed absolutely no interest in extending an inviting hand to oncoming French or English settlers. He has, moreover, gained a reputation amongst modern scholars as being one of the more conservative Gaelic rulers in thirteenth century Scotland.

Despite that, he seems to have remained loyal to his royal overlord. There is no evidence that he participated in any of the western-oriented rebellions which were so frequent in the era. The Mormaer even sent his son Maol Choluim with the king's expedition to Moray in 1232. He was also a witness to the treaty between King Alexander II of Scotland and his brother-in-law Henry III of England at Newcastle in 1237, concerning the much disputed northern counties of England.

Nevertheless, in 1238 Alexander distrusted him sufficiently to remove the Castle of Dumbarton from his control, giving the Scottish king an important foothold in the Mormaerdom. As part of the same act, Alexander II regranted the Mormaerdom to Maol Domhnaich as a military fief, indicating perhaps that the Mormaerdom's prior status was ambiguous.

He married Beatrix, the daughter of Walter, High Steward of Scotland and had two known sons (Maol Choluim and Donnchadh), and one daughter.

Maol Domhnaich's reign came to an end with his death in 1250.

Notes

Bibliography
 Neville, Cynthia J., Native Lordship in Medieval Scotland: The Earldoms of Strathearn and Lennox, c. 1140-1365, (Portland & Dublin, 2005)

1250 deaths
People from Stirling
Year of birth unknown
Mormaers of Lennox
13th-century mormaers